Agustí Sans Valls (born 27 February 1995) is a Spanish professional basketball player for CD Estela of the LEB Plata.

Career

Joventut

Sans played for Sant Lluís, La Salle Mahón, Islas Baleares and Alcázar at Balearic Islands before entering the Club Joventut Badalona on 2009. A Nike International Junior Tournament champion on 2013, he scored 14 points and handing out 6 assists in the final game against FC Barcelona. Being a farm team member, he made his professional debut on 20 October 2013, playing 13 minutes for Joventut on a Liga ACB game against FC Barcelona. He played four more games between 2013–14 and 2015–16 seasons.

In September 2016, he terminated his contract, after four seasons playing for the farm team on LEB Oro and LEB Plata.

Força Lleida
On 31 October 2016, Sans signed with LEB Oro side Força Lleida. He leaves the team after 9 games.

Oviedo
On 15 December 2016, he signed with LEB Oro side Oviedo CB. He played the rest of 2016–17 season becoming Copa Princesa de Asturias champion.

Huesca
On 25 September 2017, after joining Bilbao Basket for the preseason, Sans signed with LEB Oro side CB Peñas Huesca. He spent two seasons at Huesca.

Força Lleida
On 8 July 2019, Sans returned to LEB Oro side Força Lleida.

National team
Sans played for the Spanish men's national team on the 2010 FIBA Europe Under-16 Championship, winning a bronze medal on the 2011 tournament. He was a member of the national team on the 2012 FIBA Under-17 World Championship. He received a bronze medal on the 2013 FIBA Europe Under-18 Championship and silver on the 2014 FIBA Europe Under-20 Championship.

References

External links
ACB profile 
FEB profile 

1995 births
Living people
Spanish men's basketball players
Liga ACB players
Joventut Badalona players
CB Prat players
Força Lleida CE players
Oviedo CB players
CB Peñas Huesca players
Point guards